Oestrike Stadium is a stadium in Ypsilanti, Michigan at Eastern Michigan University. It is named after Ron Oestrike, a former baseball coach at EMU. It is primarily used for baseball, and serves as  the Eastern Michigan University Eagles baseball team home field. In addition, it served as the home field of the Midwest Sliders of Ypsilanti Frontier League baseball team in 2009 and 2010 (the Sliders were renamed the Oakland County Cruisers their second season at Oestrike Stadium as a result of their planned move to Waterford Township). Several present and former major leaguers, including Bob Welch, Bob Owchinko, Bryan Clutterbuck, Pat Sheridan, and Brian Bixler, played at Oestrike Stadium as members of the EMU baseball team.

History

Constructed in 1971, Oestrike Stadium is named after Ronald E. Oestrike. Ronald "Oak" Oestrike was a former Baseball Coach. Oestrike served as a head baseball coach from 1965 to 87. Oestrike Statium has 2,500 seats for baseball and softball events. It hosted the Mid- American Conference Baseball Tournament in 2007. In 2008, Bruce Springsteen performed at Oestrike Stadium in support of Barack Obama during his presidential candidacy. The stadium has gone through several renovations to update cosmetic needs. Oestrike stadium is located near Westview Apartments and Rynearson Stadium

See also
 List of NCAA Division I baseball venues

References

External links
 Ballpark information
 Article about Cruisers playing at ballpark

Sports venues in Michigan
College baseball venues in the United States
Minor league baseball venues
Sports venues completed in 1971
Eastern Michigan Eagles baseball
1971 establishments in Michigan